Juy may refer to:
 Juy, Yardymli, a village in Azerbaijan
 Juray language
 Lucien Juy, French industrialist